Kirpichi (translated as 'Bricks') is one of the most influential alternative groups in Russia, which was formed in 1995 as "Bricks Are Heavy".

History

Early years and rise to fame
The group's birth may be dated back to 15 May 1995, when the founder of the group, Vasya V. (Vasiliy Vasin), with Stas Sytnik and Kirill Solovyev, played a first concert in the Petersburg's House Of Pioneers. All the song lyrics were in English. And in 1996, the group wrote a concert album "Live in Polygon", which is a rarity now. About the same time as the release of "Bricks Are Heavy" in Saint Petersburg, the group "Numb Paramour" was formed, which further became a star in underground. It consists of Danny Boy (Danila Smirnov), Jay (Evgeniy Nazarov), Ilya Petrovsky and man called Nils. Because of heavy membership turnover they disbanded in 1996.

Then two groups united to give concerts and wrote some songs in incorporated lineup, but in short times many people left the group to another project, and remained trio (Vasya, Danila and Evgeniy) renamed group to Kirpichi. In May 1996 Vasya's father gave them money to record some tracks and then he made a deal with SHOCK-Records label, and soon they published album "Kirpichi tyazhely" ('Bricks are heavy'), which compiled from translated versions of previous songs. Presentation concert earn them a popularity both at public, and famous artists like Tequilajazzz, and guys fixed they fame with "Bajka" video, which was in heavy rotation on air and on TV. Fuzz magazine, very authoritative that time, awarded them as "Best new artist of the year".

In 1997 and 1998 group toured, played in many festivals and provided an opening show for Biohazard. As a result the album "Smert' na reive" ('Death at the party') which was published only in 1999, under the Gala Records label. From this recording began a hip-hop era in their history. Vasya and Danila hosted a program about hip-hop culture on the Rekord radio, which helped to grow the popularity of hip-hop in country. But old fans of the group were satisfied too, because at the live shows the group played both hip-hop and hard music. Recording of the third album was fast in spite of the heavy alcohol and drug-using by the members of group. However, tragically, the week before the release, on February 18, 2000, drummer Evgeniy Nazarov died from an overdose. The album "Kapitalizm 00" ('Capitalism-2000') contained songs with simple, but very deep lyrics over hip-hop beats. Also the album contained a tribute song to Jay.

New millennium
Fourth album of group "Sila Uma" ('Power of mind'), by critics' and crew members' opinions, is the best album of group. It contains songs in different styles, mostly in hip-hop, with catchy and clever lyrics (Vasya consider them like best that he wrote). Album also contains most famous song by group, "Dzedai" ('Jedis'). After this recording Kirpichi was considered as flagships of Russian rapcore, but next album, 2004 "Let's Rock!" broke all stereotypes because of its hardcore style. Next record, 2005 "Tsarsky albom" ('Tzar's album') consisted from love ballads in alternative rock style. The most recent album to date, 2006 "Seven" is group's traditional mix of styles. It recorded quite fast to leave Gala Records label (according to the deal, Kirpichi must have written 7 albums for label). In the early 2008, in Moscow club "Tochka" Kirpichi made a big show by their 13th birthday, where were played some tracks from upcoming album.

Discography

References

Russian rock music groups
Musical groups from Saint Petersburg
Russian alternative rock groups
Russian alternative metal musical groups
Musical groups established in 1995
Rappers from Saint Petersburg
Russian hip hop groups
Russian hip hop
Rap rock musicians
Russian musical groups